Cavaghn Miley (born 29 April 1995) is a Jersey footballer who plays as a midfielder for Southend United.

Career

Miley started his career with Jersey side St. Paul's, helping them win the league. In 2017, he signed for Eastleigh in the English fifth tier. In 2022, Miley signed for English club Southend United.

References

External links

 

1995 births
Association football midfielders
Eastleigh F.C. players
England semi-pro international footballers
Jersey footballers
Living people
National League (English football) players
Southend United F.C. players
St. Paul's F.C. players